The Israel Handball Association (IHA) is the administrative and controlling body for handball and beach handball in Israel. Founded in 1955, IHA is a member of European Handball Federation (EHF) and the International Handball Federation (IHF).

National teams
 Israel men's national handball team
 Israel men's national junior handball team
 Israel women's national handball team

Competitions
 Israeli Handball League

Affiliated clubs
Following is the list of clubs affiliated with Israel Handball Association (as of July 2020):
 HC Nes Ziona
 Hapoel Ramat Gan
 Ramat Hasharon HC
 ASA Tel Aviv
 Bnei Herzliya
 Handball Club Holon
 Hapoel Rishon LeZion
 Maccabi Rishon LeZion
 Hapoel Ashdod
 Maccabi Avishai Motzkin
 Maccabi Rehovot
 Maccabi Tel Aviv

References

External links
 Official website  
 Israel at the IHF website.
 Israel at the EHF website.

Handball in Israel
Handball
Sports organizations established in 1955
1955 establishments in Israel
Handball governing bodies
European Handball Federation
National members of the International Handball Federation
Organizations based in Tel Aviv